Together for Days is a 1972 American blaxploitation independent film about a relationship between an African-American man and a Caucasian woman, and the reaction of their friends and family in Atlanta, Georgia. Directed by Michael Schultz, it marked Samuel L. Jackson's film debut. On May 6, 2010, Jackson appeared on The Tonight Show and told the audiences that Jay Leno did not find a copy of the film. Jackson said it had been re-released sometime later under the title Black Cream.

See also
 List of American films of 1972

External links
 
 

1972 films
American independent films
Films directed by Michael Schultz
Films shot in Georgia (U.S. state)
1972 directorial debut films
Films about interracial romance
Films about racism
1970s English-language films
1970s American films